The 2021–22 Charlotte Hornets season was the 32nd season of the franchise in the National Basketball Association (NBA).

Despite clinching a spot in the Play-In Tournament for the second consecutive season, the Hornets lost 132–103 to the Atlanta Hawks, and have not played in the playoffs since 2016.

After failing to make the playoffs in his four seasons as head coach, James Borrego was fired at the end of the season. He posted a 138–163 (.458) record during his tenure with the Hornets.

With the Memphis Grizzlies winning the Southwest Division title for the first time in Grizzlies' franchise history, Charlotte is now being the only NBA franchise to have never won a division title, having gone 32 seasons without winning a division title since the franchise began play in the 1988–89 season.

NBA draft

Roster

Standings

Division

Conference

Game log

Preseason

|-style="background:#cfc;"
| 1
| October 4
| @ Oklahoma City
| 
| James Bouknight (20)
| McDaniels, Plumlee (7)
| LaMelo Ball (5)
| Paycom CenterN/A
| 1–0
|-style="background:#fcc;"
| 2
| October 7
| Memphis
| 
| Terry Rozier (21)
| Martin, Washington (5)
| LaMelo Ball (7)
| Spectrum Center8,916
| 1–1
|-style="background:#fcc;"
| 3
| October 11
| @ Miami
| 
| Miles Bridges (22)
| Miles Bridges (10)
| LaMelo Ball (9)
| FTX Arena19,600
| 1–2
|-style="background:#fcc;"
| 4
| October 13
| Dallas
|  
| James Bouknight (12)
| Nick Richards (9)
| Cody Martin (2)
| Spectrum Center8,583
| 1–3

Regular season

|-style="background:#cfc;"
| 1
| October 20
| Indiana
|  
| LaMelo Ball (31)
| Mason Plumlee (10)
| LaMelo Ball (7)
| Spectrum Center15,521
| 1–0
|-style="background:#cfc;"
| 2
| October 22
| @ Cleveland
| 
| Miles Bridges (30)
| Mason Plumlee (14)
| Ish Smith (8)
| Rocket Mortgage FieldHouse17,116
| 2–0
|-style="background:#cfc;"
| 3
| October 24
| @ Brooklyn
| 
| Miles Bridges (32)
| Bridges, Oubre Jr. (9)
| Gordon Hayward (6)
| Barclays Center17,732
| 3–0
|-style="background:#fcc;"
| 4
| October 25
| Boston
| 
| Ball, Bridges (25)
| Mason Plumlee (11)
| LaMelo Ball (9)
| Spectrum Center17,238
| 3–1
|-style="background:#cfc;"
| 5
| October 27
| @ Orlando
| 
| Miles Bridges (31)
| Mason Plumlee (10)
| Hayward, Martin (5)
| Amway Center14,082
| 4–1
|-style="background:#fcc;"
| 6
| October 29
| @ Miami
| 
| Gordon Hayward (23)
| Miles Bridges (8)
| LaMelo Ball (6)
| FTX Arena19,600
| 4–2
|-style="background:#cfc;"
| 7
| October 31
| Portland
| 
| LaMelo Ball (27)
| LaMelo Ball (9)
| Miles Bridges (9)
| Spectrum Center14,960
| 5–2

|-style="background:#fcc;"
| 8
| November 1
| Cleveland
| 
| LaMelo Ball (30)
| Miles Bridges (9)
| Miles Bridges (8)
| Spectrum Center13,889
| 5–3
|-style="background:#fcc;"
| 9
| November 3
| @ Golden State
| 
| Miles Bridges (32)
| Gordon Hayward (11)
| LaMelo Ball (8)
| Chase Center18,064
| 5–4
|-style="background:#fcc;"
| 10
| November 5
| @ Sacramento
| 
| Gordon Hayward (25)
| Mason Plumlee (6)
| LaMelo Ball (13)
| Golden 1 Center14,905
| 5–5
|-style="background:#fcc;"
| 11
| November 7
| @ L.A. Clippers
|  
| LaMelo Ball (21)
| Terry Rozier (8)
| Miles Bridges (6)
| Staples Center15,781
| 5–6
|-style="background:#fcc;"
| 12
| November 8
| @ L.A. Lakers
| 
| Terry Rozier (29)
| LaMelo Ball (15)
| LaMelo Ball (11)
| Staples Center18,997
| 5–7
|-style="background:#cfc;"
| 13
| November 10
| @ Memphis
| 
| Kelly Oubre Jr. (37)
| Ball, Bridges (9)
| LaMelo Ball (8)
| FedExForum13,880
| 6–7
|-style="background:#cfc;"
| 14
| November 12
| New York
| 
| Miles Bridges (24)
| LaMelo Ball (17)
| LaMelo Ball (9)
| Spectrum Center19,257
| 7–7
|-style="background:#cfc;"
| 15
| November 14
| Golden State
| 
| Miles Bridges (22)
| Bridges, Martin (8)
| Mason Plumlee (6)
| Spectrum Center19,559
| 8–7
|-style="background:#cfc;"
| 16
| November 17
| Washington
| 
| Terry Rozier (19)
| Mason Plumlee (13)
| LaMelo Ball (14)
| Spectrum Center14,402
| 9–7
|-style="background:#cfc;"
| 17
| November 19
| Indiana
| 
| LaMelo Ball (32)
| LaMelo Ball (11)
| LaMelo Ball (8)
| Spectrum Center16,787
| 10–7
|-style="background:#fcc;"
| 18
| November 20
| @ Atlanta
| 
| Miles Bridges (35)
| Ball, Bridges (10)
| LaMelo Ball (11)
| State Farm Arena17,320
| 10–8
|-style="background:#cfc;"
| 19
| November 22
| @ Washington
| 
| Terry Rozier (32)
| LaMelo Ball (13)
| LaMelo Ball (7)
| Capital One Arena16,575
| 11–8
|-style="background:#cfc;"
| 20
| November 24
| @ Orlando
| 
| Terry Rozier (27)
| Miles Bridges (9)
| Bridges, Martin (6)
| Amway Center16,114
| 12–8
|-style="background:#cfc;"
| 21
| November 26
| Minnesota
| 
| Kelly Oubre Jr. (27)
| Jalen McDaniels (8)
| LaMelo Ball (13)
| Spectrum Center19,314
| 13–8
|-style="background:#fcc;"
| 22
| November 27
| @ Houston
| 
| Terry Rozier (31)
| LaMelo Ball (11)
| LaMelo Ball (13)
| Toyota Center14,687
| 13–9
|-style="background:#fcc;"
| 23
| November 29
| @ Chicago
| 
| Terry Rozier (31)
| Miles Bridges (8)
| LaMelo Ball (13)
| United Center21,366
| 13–10

|-style="background:#fcc;"
| 24
| December 1
| @ Milwaukee
| 
| LaMelo Ball (36)
| P. J. Washington (10)
| LaMelo Ball (9)
| Fiserv Forum17,341
| 13–11
|-style="background:#cfc;"
| 25
| December 5
| @ Atlanta
| 
| Miles Bridges (32)
| P. J. Washington (11)
| Ish Smith (7)
| State Farm Arena16,383
| 14–11
|-style="background:#fcc;"
| 26
| December 6
| Philadelphia
| 
| Kelly Oubre Jr. (35)
| P. J. Washington (8)
| Gordon Hayward (9)
| Spectrum Center14,462
| 14–12
|-style="background:#fcc;"
| 27
| December 8
| Philadelphia
| 
| Gordon Hayward (31)
| Kelly Oubre Jr. (10)
| Gordon Hayward (7)
| Spectrum Center15,709
| 14–13
|-style="background:#cfc;"
| 28
| December 10
| Sacramento
| 
| James Bouknight (24)
| Cody Martin (8)
| Miles Bridges (8)
| Spectrum Center16,335
| 15–13
|-style="background:#fcc;"
| 29
| December 13
| @ Dallas
| 
| Oubre Jr., Rozier (20)
| Miles Bridges (10)
| Gordon Hayward (6)
| American Airlines Center19,213
| 15–14
|-style="background:#cfc;"
| 30
| December 15
| @ San Antonio
| 
| Gordon Hayward (41)
| Jalen McDaniels (10)
| Miles Bridges (8)
| AT&T Center14,354
| 16–14 
|-style="background:#fcc;"
| 31
| December 17
| @ Portland
| 
| LaMelo Ball (27) 
| Miles Bridges (6)
| Miles Bridges (11) 
| Moda Center18,399
| 16–15
|-style="background:#fcc;"
| 32
| December 19
| @ Phoenix
| 
| Miles Bridges (26)
| LaMelo Ball (10)
| LaMelo Ball (7)
| Footprint Center17,071
| 16–16
|-style="background:#fcc;"
| 33
| December 20
| @ Utah
| 
| Miles Bridges (21) 
| Miles Bridges (11) 
| LaMelo Ball (11)
| Vivint Arena18,306
| 16–17
|-style="background:#cfc;"
| 34
| December 23
| @ Denver
| 
| Kelly Oubre Jr. (23)
| P. J. Washington (9)
| P. J. Washington (5)
| Ball Arena17,003
| 17–17
|-style="background:#cfc;"
| 35
| December 27
| Houston
| 
| Terry Rozier (27)
| Mason Plumlee (9)
| LaMelo Ball (7)
| Spectrum Center19,349
| 18–17
|-style="background:#cfc;"
| 36
| December 29
| @ Indiana
| 
| Terry Rozier (35)
| Ball, Plumlee (12)
| LaMelo Ball (9)
| Gainbridge Fieldhouse17,608
| 19-17

|-style="background:#fcc;"
| 37
| January 2
| Phoenix
| 
| LaMelo Ball (17)
| Hayward, Richards (7)
| Ish Smith (8)
| Spectrum Center19,088
| 19–18
|-style="background:#fcc;"
| 38
| January 3
| @ Washington
| 
| Gordon Hayward (27)
| Miles Bridges (14)
| Mason Plumlee (7)
| Capital One Arena8,902
| 19–19
|-style="background:#cfc;"
| 39
| January 5
| Detroit
|  
| Kelly Oubre Jr. (32)
| Ball, Washington (8)
| LaMelo Ball (12)
| Spectrum Center14,427
| 20–19
|-style="background:#cfc;"
| 40
| January 8
| Milwaukee
| 
| Terry Rozier (28)
| Ball, Bridges, Washington (8)
| LaMelo Ball (8)
| Spectrum Center19,139
| 21–19
|-style="background:#cfc;"
| 41
| January 10
| Milwaukee
| 
| Terry Rozier (27)
| Miles Bridges (11)
| P. J. Washington (5)
| Spectrum Center14,253
| 22–19
|-style="background:#cfc;"
| 42
| January 12
| @ Philadelphia
| 
| Gordon Hayward (30)
| Bridges, Washington (8)
| LaMelo Ball (8)
| Wells Fargo Center20,317
| 23–19
|-style="background:#fcc;"
| 43
| January 14
| Orlando
|  
| LaMelo Ball (23) 
| Mason Plumlee (10)
| LaMelo Ball (8)
| Spectrum Center16,011
| 23–20
|-style="background:#cfc;"
| 44
| January 17
| @ New York
| 
| Miles Bridges (38)
| Miles Bridges (12)
| Terry Rozier (7)
| Madison Square Garden19,812
| 24–20
|-style="background:#cfc;"
| 45
| January 19
| @ Boston
| 
| Terry Rozier (28)
| Ball, Plumlee (10)
| Ball, Rozier (10)
| TD Garden19,156
| 25–20
|-style="background:#cfc;"
| 46
| January 21
| Oklahoma City
| 
| Terry Rozier (24)
| Miles Bridges (14)
| Terry Rozier (9)
| Spectrum Center15,835
| 26–20
|-style="background:#fcc;"
| 47
| January 23
| Atlanta
| 
| Ball, Bridges (19)
| Mason Plumlee (11)
| Terry Rozier (7)
| Spectrum Center15,822
| 26–21
|-style="background:#fcc;"
| 48
| January 25
| @ Toronto
| 
| LaMelo Ball (25)
| Mason Plumlee (9)
| LaMelo Ball (7)
| Scotiabank Arena0
| 26–22
|-style="background:#cfc;"
| 49
| January 26
| @ Indiana
| 
| Kelly Oubre Jr. (39)
| LaMelo Ball (10)
| LaMelo Ball (13)
| Gainbridge Fieldhouse14,116
| 27–22
|-style="background:#cfc;"
| 50
| January 28
| L.A. Lakers
| 
| Miles Bridges (26)
| Mason Plumlee (17)
| Bridges, Plumlee (6)
| Spectrum Center19,469
| 28–22
|-style="background:#fcc;"
| 51
| January 30
| L.A. Clippers
| 
| LaMelo Ball (23)
| Mason Plumlee (10)
| LaMelo Ball (10)
| Spectrum Center19,600
| 28–23

|-style="background:#fcc;"
| 52
| February 2
| @ Boston
| 
| LaMelo Ball (38)
| Mason Plumlee (17)
| LaMelo Ball (9)
| TD Garden19,156
| 28–24
|-style="background:#fcc;"
| 53
| February 4
| Cleveland
| 
| Terry Rozier (24)
| Mason Plumlee (11)
| Miles Bridges (7)
| Spectrum Center17,733
|28–25
|-style="background:#fcc;"
| 54
| February 5
| Miami
| 
| Terry Rozier (16)
| Mason Plumlee (10)
| Miles Bridges (5)
| Spectrum Center19,420
| 28–26
|-style="background:#fcc;"
| 55
| February 7
| Toronto
| 
| Miles Bridges (25)
| P. J. Washington (9)
| LaMelo Ball (9)
| Spectrum Center14,102
| 28–27
|-style="background:#fcc;"
| 56
| February 9
| Chicago
| 
| LaMelo Ball (33)
| Mason Plumlee (11)
| Terry Rozier (6)
| Spectrum Center19,099
| 28-28
|-style="background:#cfc;"
| 57
| February 11
| @ Detroit
| 
| LaMelo Ball (31)
| Plumlee, Rozier (10)
| LaMelo Ball (12)
| Little Caesars Arena20,088
| 29–28
|-style="background:#fcc;"
| 58
| February 12
| Memphis
|  
| Terry Rozier (35)
| Mason Plumlee (12)
| Terry Rozier (9)
| Spectrum Center19,454
| 29–29
|-style="background:#fcc;"
| 59
| February 15
| @ Minnesota
| 
| Miles Bridges (28)
| Mason Plumlee (17)
| Mason Plumlee (9)
| Target Center17,136
| 29–30
|-style="background:#fcc;"
| 60
| February 17
| Miami
| 
| Miles Bridges (29)
| P. J. Washington (14)
| LaMelo Ball (14)
| Spectrum Center17,029
| 29–31
|-style="background:#cfc;"
| 61
| February 25
| Toronto
| 
| Oubre Jr., Rozier (23)
| Bridges, Harrell, Plumlee (10)
| Terry Rozier (9)
| Spectrum Center17,577
| 30–31
|-style="background:#fcc;"
| 62
| February 27
| Detroit
| 
| Terry Rozier (33)
| Miles Bridges (10)
| LaMelo Ball (7)
| Spectrum Center15,348
| 30–32
|-style="background:#fcc;"
| 63
| February 28
| @ Milwaukee
| 
| LaMelo Ball (24) 
| Kelly Oubre Jr. (7)
| Terry Rozier (8)
| Fiserv Forum17,341
| 30–33

|-style="background:#cfc;"
| 64
| March 2
| @ Cleveland
| 
| Terry Rozier (29)
| Montrezl Harrell (9)
| Terry Rozier (7)
| Rocket Mortgage FieldHouse19,019
| 31–33
|-style="background:#cfc;"
| 65
| March 5
| San Antonio
| 
| Terry Rozier (31)
| Mason Plumlee (13)
| LaMelo Ball (7)
| Spectrum Center18,941
| 32–33
|-style="background:#fcc;"
| 66
| March 8
| Brooklyn
| 
| Bridges, Rozier (30)
| Rozier, Washington (8)
| LaMelo Ball (7)
| Spectrum Center17,230
| 32–34
|-style="background:#fcc;"
| 67
| March 9
| Boston
| 
| Bridges, Washington (17)
| Mason Plumlee (15)
| Mason Plumlee (6)
| Spectrum Center18,066
| 32–35
|-style="background:#cfc;"
| 68
| March 11
| @ New Orleans
| 
| Miles Bridges (26)
| Miles Bridges (8)
| Ball, Bridges (9)
| Smoothie King Center16,838
| 33–35
|-style="background:#cfc;"
| 69
| March 14
| @ Oklahoma City
| 
| Terry Rozier (30)
| Mason Plumlee (11)
| Mason Plumlee (8)
| Paycom Center15,810
| 34–35
|-style="background:#cfc;"
| 70
| March 16
| Atlanta
| 
| LaMelo Ball (22)
| Mason Plumlee (10)
| LaMelo Ball (11)
| Spectrum Center16,648
| 35–35
|-style="background:#cfc;"
| 71
| March 19
| Dallas
| 
| Miles Bridges (23)
| Bridges, Martin (8)
| LaMelo Ball (7)
| Spectrum Center19,279
| 36–35
|-style="background:#cfc;"
| 72
| March 21
| New Orleans
| 
| Ball, Rozier (17)
| Mason Plumlee (10)
| LaMelo Ball (9)
| Spectrum Center13,351
| 37–35
|-style="background:#fcc;"
| 73
| March 23
| New York
| 
| LaMelo Ball (32)
| Ball, Bridges (9)
| Miles Bridges (9)
| Spectrum Center16,290
| 37–36
|-style="background:#cfc;"
| 74
| March 25
| Utah
| 
| Miles Bridges (26)
| Bridges, Plumlee (11)
| Ball, Washington (5)
| Spectrum Center19,162
| 38–36
|-style="background:#cfc;"
| 75
| March 27
| @ Brooklyn
| 
| LaMelo Ball (33)
| P. J. Washington (11)
| LaMelo Ball (9)
| Barclays Center18,166
| 39–36
|-style="background:#fcc;"
| 76
| March 28
| Denver
| 
| Miles Bridges (27)
| Miles Bridges (11)
| LaMelo Ball (11)
| Spectrum Center17,614
| 39–37
|-style="background:#cfc;"
| 77
| March 30
| @ New York
| 
| Miles Bridges (31)
| Bridges, Washington (6)
| LaMelo Ball (15)
| Madison Square Garden19,812
| 40–37

|-style="background:#fcc;"
| 78
| April 2
| @ Philadelphia
| 
| Miles Bridges (20)
| Miles Bridges (5)
| Terry Rozier (6)
| Wells Fargo Center21,509
| 40–38
|-style="background:#fcc;"
| 79
| April 5
| @ Miami
| 
| Miles Bridges (29)
| Bridges, Plumlee, Washington (6)
| LaMelo Ball (14)
| FTX Arena19,600
| 40–39
|-style="background:#cfc;"
| 80
| April 7
| Orlando
| 
| LaMelo Ball (26)
| Ball, Rozier (8)
| LaMelo Ball (9)
| Spectrum Center16,427
| 41–39
|-style="background:#cfc;"
| 81
| April 8
| @ Chicago
|  
| LaMelo Ball (24)
| Montrezl Harrell (6)
| LaMelo Ball (9)
| United Center21,461
| 42–39
|-style="background:#cfc;"
| 82
| April 10
| Washington
| 
| Terry Rozier (25)
| LaMelo Ball (10)
| LaMelo Ball (9)
| Spectrum Center18,465
| 43–39

Play-in

|- style="background:#fcc;"
| 1
| April 13
| @ Atlanta
| 
| Lamelo Ball (26)
| Martin, Washington (6)
| Lamelo Ball (7)
| State Farm Arena18,137
| 0–1

Transactions

Trades

Free agents

Re-signed

Additions

Subtractions

Notes

References

Charlotte Hornets seasons
Charlotte Hornets
Charlotte Hornets
Charlotte Hornets